Trino, Piedmont is a commune in Italy.

Trino may also refer to:

People
 Trino Yelamos (1915–1989), French racing cyclist
 Trino Arizcorreta (1902–?), Spanish football player
 Trino Cruz (born 1960), Gibraltarian poet

Technology
 Trino (SQL query engine), a fork of the Presto database query engine